Tangavelleda tanzanicola is a species of beetle in the family Cerambycidae, and the only species in the genus Tangavelleda. It was described by Téocchi in 1997.

References

Morimopsini
Beetles described in 1997